Major-General John Cecil Alexander Dowse  (1891–1964) was an Irish-born British Army medical officer in World War I and World War II. He played rugby for Ireland in 1914.

Biography
Dowse was born at Glenageary, county Dublin, where his father was rector of St Paul's Church. In 1894 the family moved to Monkstown where Dowse later played rugby for Monkstown Football Club. He was educated at Trent College, Derbyshire, and Trinity College Dublin.

In 1914 Dowse played rugby for Ireland against France, Scotland and Wales. However, his rugby career was cut short by the outbreak of World War I and he was commissioned as a lieutenant in the Royal Army Medical Corps in August 1914. He served on the Western Front and in India, remained in the army after the war and served during World War II in  France, North Africa, Italy and Egypt. He ended the war with the rank of acting Major-General (made substantive in November 1945). After the war he was Commandant and Director of Studies at the Royal Army Medical College 1948–49. He then retired and was colonel commandant of the RAMC (a ceremonial position) 1950–56.

Dowse was appointed a Commander of the Order of St John in 1947. The Greek government awarded him the Grand Cross of the Royal Order of the Phoenix in 1948.

Notes

References
DOWSE, Major-General John Cecil Alexander, Who Was Who, A & C Black, 1920–2015; online edn, Oxford University Press, 2014
John Dowse at Scrum.com
IRFU Profile

External links

Generals of World War II

1891 births
1964 deaths
Irish rugby union players
Ireland international rugby union players
Monkstown Football Club players
People educated at Trent College
Alumni of Trinity College Dublin
Royal Army Medical Corps officers
British Army personnel of World War I
British Army generals of World War II
Companions of the Order of the Bath
Commanders of the Order of the British Empire
Recipients of the Military Cross
Commanders of the Order of St John
Grand Crosses of the Order of the Phoenix (Greece)
People from Glenageary
British Army major generals
Rugby union forwards
Rugby union players from County Dublin
Sportspeople from Dún Laoghaire–Rathdown
People from Monkstown, County Dublin